CJRX-FM is a radio station in Lethbridge, Alberta, Canada. Owned by Rogers Sports & Media, the station airs a mainstream rock format branded as 106.7 Rock.

History
The station was founded as CJOC in 1926, named after its founder, Jock Palmer. In 1928, it was bought by Taylor Pearson & Carson, which evolved into Selkirk Communications. Originally on 1100 AM, it moved to 1120 in 1928, 1400 in 1942 and 1220 in 1960.

The station was a founding affiliate of the Canadian Broadcasting Corporation in 1936 and then of its Trans-Canada Network until 1962 when it became a CBC Radio network affiliate. The station disaffiliated in 1978.

Along with most of Selkirk's radio holdings, CJOC was sold to Rogers in 1989 after Selkirk merged with Maclean-Hunter. On January 19, 2000 CJOC moved to FM under new call letters, CJRX-FM. With the new frequency and call letters also came with a change in genre, from country to rock.

In June 2016, Rock 106 slightly rebranded to 106.7 Rock.

References

External links
 106.7 Rock
 
 

Jrx
Jrx
Jrx
Radio stations established in 1926
1926 establishments in Alberta